Linville Falls is a waterfall located in the Blue Ridge Mountains of North Carolina in the United States.   The falls move in several distinct steps, beginning in a twin set of upper falls, moving down a small gorge, and culminating in a high-volume  drop.

It is named for the Linville River, which goes over the falls.  Linville Falls has the highest volume of any waterfall on the Northern Edge of the Blue Ridge Mountains.

Natural history
Linville Falls marks the beginning of the Linville Gorge, which is formed by the Linville River, which continues on after the falls before finally ending near Lake James.

At one time, the upper section of the main plunge was the same height as the lower section, however, flooding caused the upper section to collapse on top of the lower falls, making the lower falls a considerably longer plunge.

History
The Carnegie Hero Fund Commission recounted an incident. "Charles W. Davis, 23, beekeeper, saved Hallie L. Hartman, 20, from drowning, Linville Falls, North Carolina, August 30, 1928. Miss Hartman fell into the Linville River and was carried 300 feet through swift water and dropped 30 feet over a fall into a pool in which the water was 45 feet deep and very cold. The banks of the pool were high and precipitous. Davis descended high rock ledges with difficulty to a low ledge at the pool, becoming winded. Fully clothed, he swam 40 feet through rough water to Miss Hartman, who was unconscious. Grasping her, he swam 15 feet with great exertion against a strong undercurrent that pulled toward the falls and then swam 65 feet farther to a low point at the bank. As he tried to push Miss Hartman upon the bank, he fell to his knees from fatigue but got to his feet quickly and placed Miss Hartman upon the bank. After prolonged efforts, Miss Hartman was revived."

The falls were donated to the National Park Service in 1952 by John D. Rockefeller, Jr.  He provided about $100,000 for purchase of the land, including a  area surrounding the falls and a part of Linville Gorge, from Giulia Luginbuhl of Des Moines, IA, whose father, F. W. Hossfeld of Morganton, NC, had purchased the property about 1900.

In 2010, professional extreme kayaker Pat Keller, safely dropped down the main 35 ft falls, which he admitted was not only illegal but “is very unsafe for kayakers and hikers alike."

Visiting the falls

The falls is owned by the National Park Service, which operates a visitor center and several miles of non-handicapped accessible trails with 4 overlooks for the falls. The  Upper Falls trail leads to the top of the falls, where visitors can see the small twin upper falls and the water spiraling through a small canyon on its way to the main falls.

The Erwin's View trail leads to 2 overlooks, the Chimney View overlook (0.7 miles) and the Erwin's View overlook (0.8 miles).  The  Plunge Basin Trail leads to the Plunge Basin Overlook, which provides a view of the falls from the other side of the river. Finally, the  Gorge Trail, which branches off from the Plunge Basin trail, leads to an area near the foot of the falls.

Swimming is unsafe above the falls but is safe in the big pool below the falls. Swimmers are advised to avoid swimming near the falling water, and to avoid the water when the current is high.

Nearby falls
 Duggers Creek Falls  is located in the Linville Falls National Recreation Area.  It can be reached by the short Duggers Creek Falls trail, which starts at the back right corner of the paved parking lot from the Visitor Center.  The small falls can be seen on the right from a footbridge over the creek.
 Toms Creek Falls
 Crabtree Falls

References

External links 

 Linville Falls at NCWaterfalls.com
 Duggers Creek Falls at NCWaterfalls.com
 UNC Asheville's Linville Falls Site
 BRP Trails: Linville Falls Trails
 NC DPI's Linville Falls Page
 Linville Falls on AshevilleNow's WNC Waterfalls Guide
 Photos from Panaramio
 Photos of Linville Waterfalls
 Photos of the Linville Falls Plunge Basin
 Pat Keller makes first descent of linville-falls

Protected areas of Burke County, North Carolina
Waterfalls of North Carolina
Blue Ridge Parkway
Landforms of Burke County, North Carolina